An arrestor bed or arrester bed is an area of special material designed to stop a runaway vehicle.  Arrestor beds include:

Engineered materials arrestor system, crushable concrete used to stop aircraft which overrun a runway
Runaway truck ramps on highways
Railway safety sidings